2015 World Series is the 2015 championship series of Major League Baseball.

It may also refer to:

 Baseball and softball

2015 College World Series
2015 Little League Softball World Series
2015 Little League World Series

 Other

2015 PSA World Series
2015 World Series of Poker
2015 World Series by Renault season
2015 WSA World Series
2015–16 America's Cup World Series